General elections were held in Jamaica on 29 February 1972. The result was a victory for the People's National Party, which won 37 of the 53 seats. Voter turnout was 78.9%.

Results

References

1972 in Jamaica
Elections in Jamaica
Jamaica